is a Japanese shōjo manga series written and illustrated by Yuki Shiwasu. The series has been serialized in Hana to Yume since 2014. The story follows the interactions of 16-year-old Hana Nonomura and 26-year-old Takane Saibara after Hana takes her sister's place in an arranged marriage meeting with Takane. The series received a live-action television series and a drama CD in 2019.

Story
Hana Nonomura takes the place of her older sister in an arranged marriage meeting with Takane Saibara, the heir to the Takaba conglomerate where her father works. Despite his wealth and handsome exterior, Takane is actually rude and arrogant, which leads Hana to immediately end the meeting by throwing her disguise in his face. However, Takane is amused by Hana's disillusionment with him, and continues to pursue her even after learning that she is in fact not her adult sister. Takane tries to woo Hana by constantly taking her to fancy restaurants, elaborate trips, and buying opulent gifts as he pompously works to get her to cave in to him and his lifestyle. Takane and Hana come to enjoy their "arrangement" and through a constant battle of bickering with each other, come to learn about and care for one another.

Characters
 
 Voiced by: Yurika Kubo (Drama CD), Played by: Aisa Takeuchi
 Hana is a 16-year-old high schooler. She meets Takane when she takes her sister Yukari's place in an arranged marriage meeting with him. Hana immediately finds Takane's arrogant and spoiled personality obnoxious, to the point were she throws her wig in his face at the arranged marriage meeting. Hana reluctantly begins to hang out with Takane after school and in her spare time, but eventually becomes attached to their interactions.
 
 Voiced by: Kazuyuki Okitsu (Drama CD), Played by: Mahiro Takasugi
 Takane is a 26-year-old, and later 27-year-old, business man and grandson of Takaba Corporation head Soten Takaba. Takane keeps Hana around after their initial meeting because he likes that Hana doesn't like him for his wealth or looks. He often takes her to expensive restaurants, picks her up in his European sports car, and brings her dozens of roses. This is not because he has romantic feelings for her, but to make her cave in to enjoying an opulent lifestyle and feel indebted to Takane. Despite his arrogant attitude, Takane is actually excellent at his job and is often praised by his coworkers, saying the firm would fall apart without him. Takane wakes up very early, around 5 a.m., and likes to jog in the morning. He also stays up late working on work-related matters.
 
 Voiced by: Takahiro Sakurai (Drama CD), Played by: Asahi Ito
 Nicola is the heir to an Italian company. He met Takane in college. Nicola later frequents Okamon's family's restaurant. He is often seen with many women around him and has an extroverted and fun personality. Despite seeming to carefree, he cares for Takane and often looks after him.
 
 Voiced by: Yuma Uchida (Drama CD), Played by: Kenshin Endō
 Nicknamed "Okamon" by Hana and his classmates, he is Hana's childhood friend. His family runs an okonomiyaki restaurant. He is often annoyed by Takane, in part to Takane's personality and also because of his closeness to Hana. Okamon later confesses his romantic feelings for Hana. He is in the soccer club.
 
 Voiced by: Mai Nakahara (Drama CD), Played by: Arisa Deguchi
 Hana's airheaded and boy-crazy sister, who gets into an arranged marriage meeting with Takane when she delivers lunch to her dad's office at one of the subsidiaries of the Takaba Corporation. Soten Takaba, Takane's grandfather and head of the Takaba Corporation, sees Yukari's beauty and sets him up with her. However, at the time Yukari already has a boyfriend and refuses to go, hence why Hana goes in her place. She works as a receptionist at a department store.
 
 Voiced by: Ayaka Asai (Drama CD), Played by: Yū Miyazaki
 Hana's friend from school. She goes with Hana to Nicola's house once and appears to have feelings for him. She has short hair, and two brothers.
 
 Voiced by: Miyuri Shimabukuro (Drama CD), Played by: Rea Nagami
 Hana's friend from school. After going with Hana to Nicola's house, she befriends Take Jun, a member of the fictional boy band Soyokaze.
 
 Played by: Junki Tozuka
 Eiji is initially introduced as a worker for the Takaba Corporation sent by Takane's uncle to see if Takane's arranged marriage partner is really who he says she is. Eiji later apologizes and becomes Takane's personal assistant as well as keeper of his secret with Hana.
 Shigeru Nonomura
 Played by: Ryō Nishihori
 Hana's father, he works at one of the smaller offices of the Takaba Corporation. 
 Emi Nonomura
 Played by: Yūko Nitō
 Hana's mother, a housewife. She is sympathetic to Hana's situation with Takane and respects him.
 
 Played by: Toru Shinagawa
 Takane's elderly grandfather and president of the Takaba Corporation. Despite himself claiming elderly behaviors like poor eyesight (he can't tell Yukari and Hana apart), he seems apt at physical activities like golfing. He often asks Takane about his arranged marriage with Yukari and pressures him to have it move along, eventually to the point of tricking him to living with Hana and the whole Nonomura family. 
 
 Takane's young cousin who is obsessed with Takane. He already resembles Takane (or rather Takane's small form "Hikune") but styles his hair to be wavy like Takane's.
 
 Voiced by: Romi Park (Drama CD)
 Takane's high school classmate, she is transgender and has romantic feelings for Takane. She admires him because he once told her to be true to herself and embrace her gender identity.
 Yakumo Takaba
 Takane's cousin who has envied Takane for a long time. He seems to want to reconnect with Takane as adults after not seeing each other for many years, but actually has ill plans to hurt Hana and expose Takane's marriage arrangement with her.

Media
It was announced on January 19, 2019 that the series would receive a live-action television series. The series was first viewable on-demand on Fuji Television on Demand (FOD), and later run on a repeated time slot. The series debuted on March 18, 2019. A drama CD was bundled with the 13th volume of the manga on February 20, 2019. The manga is licensed in English by Viz Media under their Shojo Beat imprint.

Manga

Volume 18 special edition includes a booklet with an epilogue chapter set 7 years after the main story

Reception
The manga ranked on Takarajimasha's Kono Manga ga Sugoi! 2016 list of best manga for female readers. The series has over 2 million copies in print as of September 2019.

See also
Tamon's B-Side, another manga series by the same author

References

Fuji TV dramas
Hakusensha manga
Romantic comedy anime and manga
Shōjo manga
Transgender in anime and manga
Viz Media manga